Edith Bouvier Beale (November 7, 1917 – January 14, 2002), nicknamed Little Edie, was an American socialite, fashion model, and cabaret performer. She was a first cousin of Jacqueline Onassis and Lee Bouvier Radziwill. She is best known for her participation (along with her mother, with whom she lived) in the 1975 documentary film Grey Gardens by Albert and David Maysles.

Early life
Beale was born in New York City, the only daughter of Phelan Beale, a lawyer, and Edith Ewing Bouvier (known as "Big Edie"), the daughter of Phelan’s law partner, John Vernou Bouvier Jr. She was born at 1917 Madison Avenue (now the site of the Carlyle Hotel). She had two brothers, Phelan Beale Jr. and Bouvier Beale, and had a lavish upbringing as part of America's "Catholic aristocracy". Beale attended The Spence School and graduated from Miss Porter's School in 1935.

Known as "Little Edie," Beale was a member of the Maidstone Country Club of East Hampton. A debutante, she was presented to society during a ball at the Pierre Hotel on New Year's Day 1936. The New York Times reported on the event, where she wore a gown of white net appliqued in silver with a wreath of gardenias in her hair.

While Beale was young, her mother pursued a singing career, hiring an accompanist and playing at small venues and private parties. In the summer of 1931, Phelan Beale separated from his wife, leaving Big Edie, then 35 years old, dependent on the Bouviers for the care of herself and children. In 1946, he finally obtained a divorce, notifying his family by telegram from Mexico.

In her youth, Little Edie was a clothes model at Macy's in New York and Palm Beach, Florida. She later claimed to have dated J. Paul Getty and to have once been engaged to Joseph P. Kennedy Jr. (although in reality she only met him once). During the 1961 inauguration of John F. Kennedy, she told Joseph P. Kennedy Sr. that, if young Joe had lived, she would have been First Lady instead of Jackie. Once, Beale ran away to Palm Beach, where she was found by her father and brought home.

From 1947 to 1952, she lived in the Barbizon Hotel for Women and worked as a model, dancer, and actress. When she was in her late 30s, Beale developed alopecia totalis which caused her body hair to fall out and prompted her to wear her signature headscarves. Beale's cousin, John Davis, claims Beale once climbed a tree at the house and set her hair on fire, suggesting Beale might have contributed to her own baldness.

Grey Gardens

On July 29, 1952, Beale returned to live with her mother in the East Hampton estate Grey Gardens.

In October 1971, police raided Grey Gardens and found the house "full of litter, rife with the odor of cats and in violation of various local ordinances". The Suffolk County, New York, Board of Health prepared to evict Beale and "Big Edie" due to the unsafe condition of the property. Following the publicity, Beale's family paid a reported $30,000 to refurbish the property, settle back taxes, and give Beale and "Big Edie" a stipend (the two women's trust fund income had run out some years before). The eviction proceedings were dropped.

Beale's cousin Lee Radziwill hired documentary filmmakers Albert and David Maysles in 1972 to work on a film about the Bouvier family. At the outset, the brothers filmed Beale and "Big Edie". The original film project was not completed, and Radziwill kept the footage that had been shot of the Beales. However, the Maysles brothers were fascinated by the strange life the two women led. After raising funds for film and equipment on their own they returned and filmed 70 more hours of footage with Beale and Big Edie. The resulting 1975 film Grey Gardens is widely considered a masterpiece of the documentary genre. It was later adapted as a 2006 musical of the same name, where the characters Lee and Jackie Bouvier appear as visiting children in retrospect. An HBO television movie based upon the documentary and surrounding story of the Beales' lives, also called Grey Gardens, appeared in 2009.

The original 1972 footage featuring Radziwill visiting the Beales was released in 2017 as That Summer.

Later life 
After her mother's death in February 1977, Beale attempted to start a cabaret career at age 60 with eight shows (January 10–14, 1978) at Reno Sweeney, a Manhattan night spot at 126 W. 13th Street. The club kept the bad reviews from her (The New York Times, on January 12, 1978, called it "a public display of ineptitude"), and she faced two new audiences per night, even through a fever and recent cataract surgery.  She continued to live in Grey Gardens for about two years, according to her mother's wishes, holding out against selling the house as a teardown. In 1979, she sold the mansion to Ben Bradlee, then the executive editor of The Washington Post.

Beale moved to Bal Harbour, Florida, in late 1997. She was found dead in her apartment on January 14, 2002, aged 84; it is believed she died about five days earlier, either from a stroke or heart attack. The inscription on her grave marker reads: "I came from God. I belong to God. In the end—I shall return to God."

Legacy
Interest in the Beales' story resulted in a variety of publishing and media projects as well as various mentions in popular culture.

 The original 1975 Maysles brothers' documentary Grey Gardens.
 Grey Gardens: A New Musical debuted off-Broadway in March 2006, starring Christine Ebersole, and played on Broadway at the Walter Kerr Theatre November 2, 2006 – July 28, 2007 for 300+ performances. Little Edie was portrayed in the first act by actresses Sara Gettelfinger (off-Broadway) and Erin Davie (on Broadway). Ebersole played Little Edie in the second act. Ebersole and Mary Louise Wilson won Tony Awards.
 The Spring 2010 issue of the online literary journal BigCityLit features a pantoum by American poet Joel Allegretti called "The Belles of Grey Gardens", which is made up entirely of dialogue from the Maysles' documentary.
 In the 2011 episode of 30 Rock titled "Mrs. Donaghy," Liz Lemon (portrayed by Tina Fey) does an impression of Drew Barrymore's impersonating Little Edie.
 A February 2013 episode of RuPaul's Drag Race featured drag queen Jinkx Monsoon imitating Little Edie during the Snatch Game challenge. Inspired by that episode, Jinkx Monsoon and Peaches Christ mounted a live 90-minute musical drag parody Return to Grey Gardens.
 The first episode of the IFC mockumentary series Documentary Now! spoofed Grey Gardens in 2015, with Fred Armisen and Bill Hader as mother and daughter in Sandy Passage.
 The 2017 documentary film That Summer featured the original 1972 footage of Radziwill visiting the Beales.

Notes

References

Further reading
 My Life at Grey Gardens: Thirteen Months and Beyond by Lois Wright (2005). .
 Grey Gardens: From East Hampton to Broadway, a documentary by Albert Maysles about the making of the musical Grey Gardens.

External links
 
 

1917 births
2002 deaths
American cabaret performers
American debutantes
American female dancers
American Roman Catholics
American socialites
Beale family
Bouvier family
Burials at Locust Valley Cemetery
Dancers from New York (state)
Female models from New York (state)
Miss Porter's School alumni
People from East Hampton (town), New York
People from Miami-Dade County, Florida
People from the Upper East Side
People with alopecia universalis
Spence School alumni